John E. Pallone (born July 30, 1960) is a Democratic Party politician and former member of the Pennsylvania House of Representatives. He represented the 54th District from 12/2000 through 11/2010.

A lifelong resident of the Alle-Kiski Valley, Pallone graduated from Valley High School in 1978. He went on to earn a bachelor's degree from Grove City College, and a Juris Doctor from the Cleveland-Marshall College of Law. Pallone worked as a trial lawyer and also as the Commissioner's Coordinator for Westmoreland County.

Pallone was elected to the State House in 2000, and was defeated in his bid for a sixth term in 2010. He married his wife, Judi, in 2002.

References

External links
Project Vote Smart - Representative John E. Pallone (PA) profile
Follow the Money - John E. Pallone
2006 2004 2002 2000 campaign contributions

Democratic Party members of the Pennsylvania House of Representatives
Grove City College alumni
Cleveland–Marshall College of Law alumni
Living people
1960 births